Petr Krátký (born 31 July 1943) is a Czech rower. He competed in the men's double sculls event at the 1968 Summer Olympics.

References

1943 births
Living people
Czech male rowers
Olympic rowers of Czechoslovakia
Rowers at the 1968 Summer Olympics
Sportspeople from Liberec